Sailing/Yachting is an Olympic sport starting from the Games of the 1st Olympiad (1896 Olympics in Athens, Greece). With the exception of 1904 and possibly the canceled 1916 Summer Olympics, sailing has always been included on the Olympic schedule. sailing was always a part of the Olympic program. The Sailing program of 1984 consisted of a total of seven sailing classes (disciplines). For each class seven races were scheduled from 31 July 1984 to 8 August 1984 of the coast of Long Beach, Los Angeles County, California at the Pacific Ocean. Los Angeles hosted the Olympic sailing competitions for the second time, having previously done so during the 1932 Summer Olympics. The sailing was done on the triangular type Olympic courses.

Venue 

According to the IOC statutes the contests in all sport disciplines must be held either in, or as close as possible to the city which the IOC has chosen. The sailing conditions off the coast of Los Angeles are very suitable for Olympic sailing.  
A total of four race areas were created in the Pacific off the coast of Long Beach.

For the media a number of 40 boats was reserved. All boats were fully booked.

Competition

Overview

Continents 
 Africa
 Asia
 Oceania
 Europe
 Americas

Countries

1984 Olympic Boycott 

The Los Angeles boycott by the Soviet Union and its satellites influenced some sailing events. In the Soling the silver and bronze medalists of the 1984 worlds were missing (SR33, Boris Budnikov, Gennadi Strakh and Oleg Miron and DDR4, Helmar Nauck, Norbert Helriegel and Sven Diedering). In the Flying Dutchman the Soviet team of Sergey Borodinov and Vladyslav Akimenko were absent.

Classes (equipment)

Medal summary

Medal table

Remarks

Sailing 
 The Windglider event was held for women for the first time, making it the first women-only sailing event in Olympic history. Karen Morch of Canada won the competition.

Sailors 
During the sailing regattas at the 1984 Summer Olympics among others the following persons were competing in the various classes:
 , Tony Philp The youngest competitor:(15 years, 48 days)
 , Paul Elvstrøm The oldest participant: (56 years, 158 days)
 , Russell Coutts

See also
 Sailing at the Friendship Games

Notes

References 
 
 

 

 
1984 Summer Olympics events
1984
1984 in sailing